The IAAF World Athletics Tour was an annual global circuit of one day track and field competitions organized by the International Association of Athletics Federations (IAAF). Formed in 2006, it comprised two separate levels of athletics meetings: the first level being the IAAF Golden League and IAAF Super Grand Prix events, and the second comprising IAAF Grand Prix events and area permit meetings. It replaced the IAAF World Outdoor Meetings series, which had only started three years earlier, and rendered the IAAF Grand Prix II series defunct.

The tour featured twenty-five of the world's premier athletics meetings comprising: six Golden League meetings, five Super Grand Prix meetings and fourteen Grand Prix meetings. There were also 25 or more area permit meetings every year which were run by one of the six continental athletics associations, which featured some point-scoring events. Athletes collected points at the meetings, dependent upon their finishing position, and the overall points leaders gained entry to the annual World Athletics Final.

From 2010 onwards the World Athletics Tour is replaced by the IAAF Diamond League and IAAF World Challenge Meetings.

Editions
The IAAF World Athletics Tour calendar was subject to change during its lifetime, with the number of meetings, the constituent meetings, and the duration of the series all regularly changing from year to year. Athletes received points based on their performances at the meetings on the circuit, with more points being given at the more prestigious and competitive competitions. 

From 2006 to 2009, series points could also be scored in certain events at Area Permit Meetings (APMs), although the meetings themselves were not considered a formal part of the series. Area permit meetings were divided by continent as follows: Asian Grand Prix (Asia), CAA Grand Prix Series (Africa), EAA Outdoor Meetings (Europe), Oceania Area Permit Meetings (Oceania), NACAC Area Permit Meetings (North America), and Grand Prix Sudamericano (South America).

A total of five meeting categories existed over the lifetime of the circuit:

 GL : IAAF Golden League
 SGP : IAAF Super Grand Prix
 GP : IAAF Grand Prix
 WAF : IAAF World Athletics Final
 APM : Area Permit Meeting

Points system
Athletes earned points in each event at the designated IAAF World Athletics Tour meetings. Winning athletes at Grand Prix level meetings earned ten points, while runners-up earned between one and eight points dependent on their finishing position. The Golden League and Super Grand Prix meets were worth twice as many points. Furthermore, athletes may earned additional points at certain area permit meetings.

The athletes with the most points at the end of the season's World Athletics Tour were entered to compete at the World Athletics Final, an event which offers athletes the possibility of substantial earnings.

Meetings
The IAAF World Athletics Tour calendar was subject to change during its lifetime, with the number of meetings, the constituent meetings and the duration of the series all regularly changing from year to year. Athletes received points based on their performances at the meetings on the circuit, with more points being given at the more prestigious and competitive competitions.

The 2009 IAAF World Athletics Final was held in Thessaloniki, though it did not replace the annual meeting there
† The 2006 Shanghai Golden Grand Prix was given IAAF Permit Meeting status for that year (the only meet with that designation) due to it being held after the World Athletics Final.

References

External links
2009 official competition calendar
2009 official season website

 
World Athletics Tour
Annual athletics series
Defunct athletics competitions